is a Japanese tennis player. In April 2010, he reached his highest ATP doubles ranking of World No. 179.

Tennis career

Juniors
As a junior, Kondo reached as high as No. 23 in the junior world singles rankings in January 2000 (and No. 11 in doubles). That year, he competed in the boys' singles and doubles at the French Open, Wimbledon and the US Open, reaching the third round in singles and the quarterfinals in doubles at the latter.

Pro tour
Kondo has won 3 Challenger events in doubles. At the age of 31, he finally competed at a grand slam event in singles, participating in the qualification rounds at the 2014 Australian Open.

Doubles finals: 6 (3–3)

References

External links
 
 
 
 Official Blog

1982 births
Living people
People from Kariya, Aichi
Japanese male tennis players
Asian Games medalists in tennis
Tennis players at the 2010 Asian Games
Sportspeople from Aichi Prefecture

Asian Games bronze medalists for Japan
Medalists at the 2010 Asian Games
21st-century Japanese people